Cytidine diphosphate, abbreviated CDP, is a nucleoside diphosphate. It is an ester of pyrophosphoric acid with the nucleoside cytidine. CDP consists of the pyrophosphate group, the pentose sugar ribose, and the nucleobase cytosine.

In Bacillus subtilis and Staphylococcus aureus, CDP-activated glycerol and ribitol are necessary to build wall teichoic acid.

See also
 Nucleoside
 Nucleotide
 DNA
 RNA
 Oligonucleotide

References

Nucleotides
Phosphate esters
Pyrimidones
Pyrophosphates